Anthony "Tony" Guillory (November 10, 1942 – July 27, 2021) was an American football linebacker who played in the National Football League from 1965 through 1969.  He attended the black Hebert High School in Beaumont, Texas, and played college football at the University of Nebraska and then at Lamar State College of Technology (now Lamar University). Transferring from Nebraska to Lamar in 1962, Guillory became the first black athlete at Lamar. He was one of 16 pro footballers given the keys to the city of Beaumont in 1971.

He died on July 27, 2021, in Beaumont, Texas, at age 78.

References

1942 births
2021 deaths
American football linebackers
Lamar Cardinals football players
Los Angeles Rams players
Nebraska Cornhuskers football players
Philadelphia Eagles players
Sportspeople from Beaumont, Texas
People from Opelousas, Louisiana
Players of American football from Texas
African-American players of American football
20th-century African-American sportspeople
21st-century African-American people